Year 1366 (MCCCLXVI) was a common year starting on Thursday (link will display the full calendar) of the Julian calendar.

Events 
 March 13 – Henry II deposes his half-brother, Pedro of Castile, to become King of Castile.
 October 12 – Frederick III of Sicily forbids decorations on synagogues.
 October 26 – Comet 55P/Tempel–Tuttle passes  from Earth.

Date unknown 
 War continues between the Hindu Vijayanagar Empire and the Muslim Bahmani Sultanate in modern-day southern India. 
 Dmitri Donskoi, ruler of Moscow and Vladimir, makes peace with Dmitri Konstantinovich, former ruler of Vladimir.
 Abu Faris Abd al-Aziz I of Morocco succeeds assassinated Abu Zayyan as Sultan of the Marinid Empire in Morocco.
 The Statutes of Kilkenny are passed, aiming to curb the decline of the Hiberno-Norman Lordship of Ireland.
 The Den Hoorn brewery is founded at Leuven in the Low Countries. In 1708 this will be renamed the Brouwerij Artois, and later releases a beer named Stella Artois.
 Zhu Yuanzhang, leader of the Red Turban Rebellion that will overthrow the Yuan dynasty and establish the Ming dynasty two years later, begins building the walls for a new capital city at Nanjing.
 Thomas Fraser obtains lands in Aberdeenshire (Scotland) on which he starts the building of a towerhouse, that will later be known as Muchalls Castle.

Births 
 May 11 – Anne of Bohemia, queen of Richard II of England (d. 1394)
 August 28 – Jean Le Maingre, marshal of France (d. 1421)
 date unknown
 Lady Elizabeth FitzAlan, English noblewoman (d. 1425)
 Miran Shah, governor of Azerbaijan (d. 1408)
 Approximate
 Eleanor de Bohun, English noble (d.1399)

Deaths 
 January 25 – Henry Suso, German mystic (b. c. 1295)
 April 26 – Simon Islip, Archbishop of Canterbury
 May 20 – Maria of Calabria, Empress of Constantinople (b. 1329)
 Summer – Ming Yuzhen, founder of the rebel empire of Daxia (b. 1331)
 October 14 – Ibn Nubata, Arab poet (b. 1287)
 October 18 – Petrus Torkilsson, Archbishop of Uppsala

References